Osoi may refer to several villages in Romania:

 Osoi, a village in Recea-Cristur Commune, Cluj County
 Osoi, a village in Comarna Commune, Iaşi County
 Osoi, a village in Sineşti Commune, Iaşi County
 Osoi, a village in Vultureşti Commune, Suceava County